Charles Child may refer to:

 C. Judson Child, Jr. (1923–2004), American bishop
 Charles Manning Child (1869–1954), American zoologist